Ted Adams CBE (10 July 1896 – 25 May 1977) was an Australian first-class cricketer, who played for New South Wales.

After his cricket career finished, he served as deputy town clerk, then town clerk for the Sydney City Council. As deputy town clerk, he was selected as one of the council's representatives to the Coronation of Queen Elizabeth II in 1953. In the 1962 Birthday Honours, Adams was made a Commander of the Order of the British Empire (CBE).

References 

1896 births
Australian cricketers
New South Wales cricketers
1977 deaths
Commanders of the Order of the British Empire
People from Bathurst, New South Wales
Cricketers from New South Wales